The United States Air Force's  25th Intelligence Squadron (25 IS) is an intelligence unit located at Hurlburt Field, Florida. It provides intelligence support to Air Force Special Operations Command (AFSOC).

Mission
The 25 IS is a uniquely tasked unit, chartered to provide specialized intelligence across the spectrum of conflict. Squadron personnel are trained and qualified to operate as aircrew on board almost every combat aircraft within the AFSOC inventory. By integrating all-source intelligence and electronic combat capability for special operations forces (SOF), the 25 IS has made their unique intelligence resources integral to SOF mission planning, rehearsal, and execution.

History

Origin
The 25 IS originated as the 6th Photo Laboratory Section on 28 January 1944 when it activated at Fort Campbell Army Airfield, Kentucky. The unit had two other designations: the 6th Photographic Technical Unit on 30 November 1944 and the 55th Reconnaissance Technical Squadron on 4 March 1949 through its inactivation on 16 June 1952. In that period, the unit also accomplished its specialized intelligence mission at DeRidder Army Air Base (AAB), Louisiana; Stuttgart AAB, Arkansas; Brooks Field, Texas; MacDill Field, Florida; Wright Field (now Wright-Patterson AFB), Ohio; Topeka AFB (later Forbes), Kansas; Ramey AFB, Puerto Rico; and finally Eglin AFB Auxiliary Field #9 (now Hurlburt), Florida.

On 1 October 1993, the Air Force activated and redesignated the unit as the 25th Intelligence Squadron at Hurlburt. That renewed life can be traced to events that occurred during Operation Just Cause in Panama in 1989 and emerging AFSOC requirements after Operation Desert Storm in 1991. The manpower and resources that later formed the 25 IS came from an Air Force Intelligence Command (AFIC) Liaison Office (OL-MH) at AFSOC and from a 693rd Intelligence Wing detachment (Det 7) that provided the first airborne intelligence, surveillance, and reconnaissance (ISR) support to AFSOC operations. As a result of an Air Force reorganization, AFIC became the Air Intelligence Agency (AIA) on 1 October 1993. That reorganization included the activation of the 25 IS. Subsequently, the Air Force changed its name to the 25th Information Operations Squadron on 1 October 2000 and back to the 25 IS on 4 May 2008.

Operations today
The 25 IS trains and equips airborne ISR operators to fly on all AFSOC platforms to provide real-time threat warning, enhanced situational awareness, and advanced technical intelligence exploitation to AFSOC aircrews and joint special operations forces. Additionally, the 25 IS also employs a wide range of intelligence analysts, technical maintenance, and support personnel that are critical to global SOF missions.

Previous designations
 6th Photo Laboratory Section; 15 January 1944 – 30 November 1944
 6th Photographical Technical Unit; 30 November 1944 – 4 March 1949
 55th Reconnaissance Technical Squadron; 4 March 1949 – 14 October 1949; 1 November 1950 – 16 June 1952
 25th Reconnaissance Technical Squadron; 16 October 1984 – 1 October 1993
 25th Intelligence Squadron; 1 October 1993 – 1 August 2000
 25th Information Operations Squadron; 1 August 2000 – 1 April 2007
 25th Intelligence Squadron; 1 April 2007–Present

Assignments
Air Combat Command (29 September 2014 – present)
Air Force Intelligence, Surveillance, and Reconnaissance Agency (8 June 2007 – 29 September 2014)
Air Intelligence Agency (1 October 1993 – 8 June 2007)
Air Force Intelligence Command (1 October 1991 – 1 October 1993)
Electronic Security Command (1 August 1979 – 1 October 1991)
Air Force Security Service (20 October 1948 – 1 August 1979)

Wings/groups
363d Intelligence, Surveillance and Reconnaissance Wing (2015 – present)
361st Intelligence, Surveillance and Reconnaissance Group (2007 – present)

Bases stationed
Hurlburt Field, Florida (1993–present)

Decorations

References

External links

Military units and formations in Florida
0025